The 2013 Coke Zero 400 powered by Coca-Cola was a NASCAR Sprint Cup Series stock car race held on July 6, 2013, at Daytona International Speedway in Daytona Beach, Florida. Contested over 161 laps, it was the eighteenth race of the 2013 NASCAR Sprint Cup Series season. Jimmie Johnson of Hendrick Motorsports won the race, his fourth win of the season and his first Coke Zero 400 win, rendering him the first driver since Bobby Allison in 1982 to sweep the Daytona 500 and Coke Zero 400 in the same year. Tony Stewart finished second while Kevin Harvick, Clint Bowyer, and Michael Waltrip rounded out the top five.

Report

Background

The track's turns are banked at 31 degrees, while the front stretch, the location of the finish line, is banked at 18 degrees. The backstretch, which has a length of 3,000 feet, has minimal banking that is used for drainage. Tony Stewart was the defending race winner.

Before the race, Jimmie Johnson was leading the Drivers' Championship with 610 points, while Carl Edwards stood in second with 572 points. Bowyer followed in the third with 569, twenty-five points ahead of Kevin Harvick and forty-one ahead of Matt Kenseth in fourth and fifth. Dale Earnhardt Jr., with 512, was in sixth; twelve ahead of Kyle Busch, who was scored seventh. Eighth-placed Martin Truex Jr. was one point ahead of Greg Biffle and eleven ahead of Joey Logano in ninth and tenth. Kasey Kahne was eleventh with 478, while Jeff Gordon completed the first twelve positions with 477 points. In the Manufacturers' Championship, Chevrolet was leading with 119 points, nine points ahead of Toyota. Ford was third with 87 points.

Practice and qualifying

Two practice sessions were held on July 4, 2013, in preparation for the race. The first session lasted for 80 minutes, while second session was 85 minutes long. Prior to the first practice session, NASCAR officials discovered illegal roof flaps in 16 cars. Every Joe Gibbs Racing, Roush Fenway Racing, Michael Waltrip Racing and Penske Racing cars were involved, along with Jamie McMurray, Marcos Ambrose, Casey Mears, Aric Almirola and Trevor Bayne.

During the first practice session, A.J. Allmendinger, for the Phoenix Racing team, was quickest ahead of Bowyer in second and Edwards in third. Juan Pablo Montoya was scored fourth, and Earnhardt Jr. managed fifth. Paul Menard, Danica Patrick, Denny Hamlin, Ambrose, and Johnson rounded out the top ten quickest drivers in the session. In the final practice session for the race, David Reutimann was the quickest of the seventeen drivers who participated. David Ragan followed in second, ahead of Ambrose and Jeff Gordon in third and fourth. Michael Waltrip, who was thirty-sixth quickest in second practice, managed fifth.

After his qualifying run, Kyle Busch said, "I've not had many opportunities for me to win poles at restrictor-plate races, so I've got to thank the team, all the guys at Joe Gibbs Racing that did such a good job building a slick race car. It's a team effort coming to these places and having great race cars. I'm really excited to be starting up front, especially with my teammate Matt Kenseth on the front row with us." He was joined on the front row of the grid by Kenseth. Bowyer qualified third, Kahne took fourth, and Truex Jr. started fifth. Menard, Waltrip, Johnson, Ricky Stenhouse Jr., and Biffle completed the first ten positions on the grid.

Race
Kyle Busch started on pole, but Matt Kenseth led the first lap. Busch would then re-take the lead and lead the next 30 laps. The first caution waved on lap 24 when Paul Menard blew an engine. Jimmie Johnson took the lead on the restart at lap 32, as Busch started to drift back in the outside line. Johnson led until lap 70 when the caution came out as Joey Logano hit the wall in the middle of a round of green-flag pit stops. Johnson had not yet pitted and would have to restart 17th behind the cars that had already made pit stops, giving the lead to Denny Hamlin.

Nonetheless, Johnson would draft back up to the front and push Jamie McMurray past Hamlin to take the lead on lap 94. The third caution waved on lap 101 as Martin Truex Jr. got sideways and collected Hamlin and Juan Pablo Montoya, also giving Busch some significant front damage. Truex would be the only one to retire following the crash. Johnson took the lead on the restart and held it all the way until the fourth caution waved on lap 126 for a crash involving David Stremme, Aric Almirola, Greg Biffle, and A. J. Allmendinger in the tri-oval. Both Stremme and Almirola would retire from the race. Following the lap 133 restart, Johnson held the lead and was joined at the front by teammate Kasey Kahne (who was subsequently passed by both Kevin Harvick and Tony Stewart).

On lap 148, the fifth caution of the race came out for a large crash in the tri-oval. It started when Denny Hamlin lost control near the entrance of pit road and turned up the track. He went head-on into the wall and was hit by A.J. Allmendinger and Dave Blaney, almost causing Hamlin to flip. Matt Kenseth, who swerved while trying to avoid Hamlin, cut down and collected Jeff Gordon and David Reutimann, totalling six cars in all. The red flag was displayed for nine minutes to allow for cleanup and the race restarted on lap 154, with Johnson and Kahne jumping ahead of Harvick and Stewart. As they began lap 156, Johnson moved up to block a fast-approaching Marcos Ambrose and nearly lost the lead. However, Johnson blocked Ambrose out of turn two, which caused Ambrose to swerve and knock Kahne into the inside wall, bringing out another caution. Ambrose would subsequently have to pit for repairs as Johnson held the lead.

The race restarted on lap 160 (going past the scheduled distance of 160 laps and eventually ending after 161 laps) for a green-white-checker attempt with Johnson and Stewart holding the lead over Harvick and Clint Bowyer. As the field worked through turn one, Carl Edwards was turned around by Scott Speed in turn one, collecting Marcos Ambrose, Bobby Labonte, Joe Nemechek, and Landon Cassill. No caution was thrown for this wreck, which happened behind the leaders, and the field continued racing. Approaching the tri-oval, as Johnson held off Stewart to win his fourth race of the season, Danica Patrick cut down the track and was turned by David Gilliland, collecting Ryan Newman, Kyle Busch, Ricky Stenhouse Jr., Casey Mears, Greg Biffle, Jeff Burton, Terry Labonte, and more. Harvick, Bowyer, and Michael Waltrip rounded out the top five.

Of note, by winning this race, Johnson became the first driver in 31 years (since Bobby Allison in 1982) to win the Daytona 500 and the Coke Zero 400 in the same year.

Results

Qualifying

Race results

Notes

  Points include 3 Chase for the Sprint Cup points for winning, 1 point for leading a lap, and 1 point for most laps led.
  Ineligible for driver's championship points.

Standings after the race

Drivers' Championship standings

Manufacturers' Championship standings

Note: Only the top five positions are included for the driver standings.

References

Coke Zero 400
Coke Zero 400
Coke Zero 400
NASCAR races at Daytona International Speedway